Route 110 is a short highway in Jefferson County.  Its eastern terminus is at U.S. Route 67 about six miles (10 km) east of De Soto; its western terminus is at Route 21 a few miles north of De Soto.  De Soto and Olympian Village are the only cities on the route.

Route description
Route 110 begins at an intersection with Route 21 north of De Soto, heading southeast on a two-lane undivided road. The route passes through wooded areas with some fields and homes, crossing over Union Pacific's De Soto Subdivision and coming to an intersection with Route P. The road leaves the De Soto area and heads east through more rural areas with some development. Farther east, Route 110 comes to its eastern terminus at an interchange with US 67 in Olympian Village, where Route CC heads to the north.

History
In January 2012, the Missouri Highways and Transportation Commission approved the use of Missouri Route 110 to include all of Missouri's part of the Chicago–Kansas City Expressway and to correspond to Illinois 110 from Hannibal, MO to Chicago.  The CKC Missouri 110 follows Interstate 35 from the Kansas State Line in Kansas City to US 36 in Cameron, then follows US 36 (and the short part of Interstate 72) to Hannibal.

The intersection with Route 21 was relocated to the south in July 2018.

Major intersections

References

110
Transportation in Jefferson County, Missouri